Cheap Trick is an American rock band from Rockford, Illinois, formed in 1973 by guitarist Rick Nielsen, bassist Tom Petersson, lead vocalist Robin Zander and drummer Bun E. Carlos. The current lineup of the band consists of Zander, Nielsen and Petersson. Their commercially successful work bridged elements of '60s guitar pop, heavy metal, and punk rock, and would help set the template for subsequent power pop and arena rock artists.

Cheap Trick released their self-titled debut album in 1977 and, later that year, found success in Japan with the release of their second album, In Color. The band would achieve mainstream popularity in the United States in 1979 with the breakthrough No. 4 live album At Budokan and a Top 10 single, a live re-recording of "I Want You to Want Me." They followed with Dream Police (1979), their most commercially successful studio album, reaching No. 6 on the Billboard 200 chart. They later topped the US charts in 1988 with "The Flame."

Cheap Trick has performed live more than 5,000 times and sold more than 20 million albums. Over the course of its career, the band has experienced several resurgences of popularity and built a dedicated cult following. Cheap Trick was inducted into the Rock and Roll Hall of Fame in 2016.

History

Origins and early years (1969–1977)
In 1967, Rick Nielsen formed Fuse with Tom Peterson (later known as Tom Petersson), who had played in another Rockford, Illinois,  band called The Bo Weevils. With Bun E. Carlos joining on drums, Fuse moved to Philadelphia in 1971. From 1972 to 1973, they called themselves Sick Man of Europe. After a European tour in 1973, Nielsen and Petersson returned to Rockford and reunited with Carlos. According to Rolling Stone, the band adopted the name Cheap Trick on August 15, 1973. The name was inspired by the band's attendance at a Slade concert, where Petersson commented that Slade used "every cheap trick in the book" as part of their act.

Randy "Xeno" Hogan was the original lead singer for Cheap Trick. He left the band shortly after its formation and was replaced by Robin Zander.

With Robin Zander now on vocals, the band recorded a demo in 1975 and played in warehouses, bowling alleys, and various other venues around the midwestern United States. The band was signed to Epic Records in early 1976. The band released its first album, Cheap Trick, in early 1977. While favored by critics, the album did not sell well. The album's lone single, "Oh, Candy", failed to chart, as did the album. Their second album, In Color, was released later that year. The singles "I Want You To Want Me" and "Southern Girls" failed to chart. However, in 2012, In Color was ranked No. 443 on Rolling Stone magazine's list of the 500 greatest albums of all time.

Budokan brings success (1978–1980)
When Cheap Trick toured in Japan for the first time in April 1978, they were received with a frenzy reminiscent of Beatlemania. During the tour, Cheap Trick recorded two concerts at the Nippon Budokan. Ten tracks taken from both shows were compiled and released as a live album entitled Cheap Trick at Budokan, which was intended to be exclusive to Japan.

The band's third studio album, Heaven Tonight was released in May 1978. The lead-off track "Surrender" was Cheap Trick's first single to chart in the United States, peaking at No. 62. It has gone on to become one of the band's signature songs.

Demand for Cheap Trick at Budokan became so great that Epic Records finally released the album in the U.S. in February 1979. Cheap Trick at Budokan launched the band into international stardom, and the album went triple platinum in the United States. The first single from the album was the live version of "I Want You to Want Me", which had originally been released on In Color. It reached No. 7 on the Billboard Hot 100, and became Cheap Trick's best-selling single to date. The second single, "Ain't That A Shame", peaked at No. 35. "Need Your Love" had already been recorded for the forthcoming Dream Police album that had already been finished, but after the unprecedented success of Cheap Trick at Budokan, Epic postponed the album's release.

Dream Police was released later in 1979, and was their third album in a row produced by Tom Werman. The title track of the album was a hit single, as was "Voices". Dream Police also found the band taking its style in a more experimental direction by incorporating strings and dabbling in heavy metal on tracks like "Gonna Raise Hell". By 1980, Cheap Trick was headlining arenas.

On August 26, 1980, Petersson left the group to record a solo album with his wife Dagmar, using the band name Another Language. Jon Brant became Petersson's steady replacement, after a year of Cheap Trick touring and recording with Peter Comita.

All Shook Up (1980), produced by former Beatles producer George Martin, reached No. 24 on the charts and was certified gold. However, the album's high-class background did not save it from descriptions like "Led Zeppelin gone psycho".

1980s struggles (1981–1986)
In July 1981, CBS Inc. sued Cheap Trick and their manager Ken Adamany for $10 million, alleging they were attempting to coerce CBS into re-negotiating their contract and had refused to record any new material for the label since October 1980.  The lawsuit was settled in early 1982 and work commenced on the next album: One on One. The album spawned two minor hits with the power ballad "If You Want My Love" (which peaked at no. 45) and the innuendo-laced rocker "She's Tight" (which peaked at no. 65).

Cheap Trick released Next Position Please in 1983. The album's two singles, "Dancing the Night Away" and "I Can't Take It," failed to chart.

In 1984, the band recorded the title track to the Tim Matheson comedy Up The Creek, which Nielsen later called "one of the worst" songs he'd ever written.

The band released Standing on the Edge in 1985. This album was called their "best collection of bubblegum bazooka rock in years". The album's first single, "Tonight It's You", reached No. 8 on Billboards Top Rock Tracks chart.

In 1986, the band recorded "Mighty Wings", the end-title cut for the film Top Gun. They then released The Doctor in the fall.  The album's lone single, "It's Only Love", failed to chart. The music video for "It's Only Love" made history as the first music video to use captioning for hearing-impaired persons. The Doctor turned out to be the band's final album with Jon Brant as bassist.

Popular resurgence (1987–1989)
Petersson rejoined the group in 1987  and helped record 1988's Lap of Luxury, produced by Richie Zito. Due to the band's commercial decline, Epic Records insisted that the band collaborate with professional songwriters on the album. Nielsen said, "Lap of Luxury was a tough record to make. We could lie to you and tell you it was all wonderful and great. It wasn't. It was tough working with other writers. But it was a lesson for us."

"The Flame", a ballad, was issued as the first single from the album, and became the band's first-ever No. 1 hit. The second single, a cover of Elvis Presley's "Don't Be Cruel", peaked at no. 4. The other singles from the album were "Ghost Town", "Never Had a Lot to Lose", and "Let Go"; "Ghost Town" and "Never Had a Lot to Lose" also charted. Lap of Luxury went platinum and became recognized as the band's comeback album. Billboard commented: "After a long hitless streak, Cheap Trick brings it all back home. This is the quartet's punchiest effort since its mid-'70s heyday."

Transitions (1990–2015)

Busted was released in 1990. The band was allowed more creative control, and professional songwriters were only used on a handful of songs. The second single, the Diane Warren-penned "Wherever Would I Be", reached  on the charts. The single "If You Need Me" was not successful, although the track "Back 'n Blue" reached  on the U.S. Billboard Album Rock Tracks chart.

In 1991, Cheap Trick's Greatest Hits was released.

The group left Epic after the disappointing sales of Busted  to sign with Warner Bros. Records. In 1994, the band released Woke Up With A Monster. The album's title track was issued as the first single and reached No. 16 on the US Mainstream Rock charts. The album's sales were poor, and it peaked at only No. 123.

In 1997, Cheap Trick signed with indie label Red Ant Records and released Cheap Trick. The band attempted to re-introduce themselves to a new generation, as the album was self-titled and the artwork was similar to their first album which had been released twenty years before. The album was critically acclaimed and hailed as a return to form. Eleven weeks after the release, Red Ant's parent company Alliance Entertainment Corporation declared Chapter 11 bankruptcy. The single "Say Goodbye" only reached No. 119 on the charts, and the band again found themselves without a record label. Two other singles were released from the album, "Baby No More" and "Carnival Game".

Cheap Trick began to rebuild in 1998. The band toured behind the release of Cheap Trick at Budokan: The Complete Concert, and the remastered re-issues of the band's first three albums. One of the multi-night stands from this tour resulted in Music for Hangovers, a live album that featured members of the Smashing Pumpkins on two tracks. In 1999, the band recorded a cover of Big Star's 1972 song "In The Street" that was used as the theme song for the hit sitcom That '70s Show. Cheap Trick ended the song with the lyric "We're all all right," which was drawn from their own 1978 song "Surrender".
 
After spending much of 2001 writing songs and about six weeks in pre-production, Cheap Trick went into Bearsville Studios in Woodstock, New York in March 2002, where they recorded their first studio album in six years, Special One in May 2003.

Cheap Trick released Rockford on Cheap Trick Unlimited/Big3 Records in 2006. The first single from the album was "Perfect Stranger" (produced by Linda Perry and co-written by Cheap Trick and Perry). The band also appeared in a McDonald's advertising campaign called "This Is Your Wake-Up Call" featuring the band.

In 2007, officials of Rockford, Illinois honored Cheap Trick by reproducing the Rockford album cover art on that year's city vehicle sticker. On June 19, 2007, the Illinois Senate passed Senate Resolution 255, which designated April 1 of every year as Cheap Trick Day in the State of Illinois. In August of that year, Cheap Trick honored the 40th anniversary of Sgt. Pepper's Lonely Hearts Club Band by playing the album in its entirety with the Hollywood Bowl Orchestra, conducted by Edwin Outwater, along with guest vocalists including Joan Osborne and Aimee Mann.

On April 24, 2008, Cheap Trick performed at the Budokan arena for the 30th anniversary of the 1978 album Cheap Trick at Budokan.

Bun E. Carlos stopped touring and recording with them and he has officially left the band in 2010. Rick Nielsen's son Daxx, who had filled in for Bun E. while he was recovering from back surgery in 2001, became the band's touring drummer. 

On July 17, 2011, at the Bluesfest in Ottawa, a thunderstorm blew through the festival area 20 minutes into the band's set. The band and crew were on the stage when, without warning, the 40-ton roof fell. It fell away from the audience and landed on the band's truck, which was parked alongside the back of the stage. The van broke the fall and allowed everyone about 30 seconds to escape.

Carlos filed a lawsuit against his former bandmates in 2013. He claimed that even though they claimed that he was departed from Cheap Trick, he was not being allowed to participate in band-related activities, including recording. The remaining three members of Cheap Trick filed a countersuit, seeking a legal affirmation of their removal of Carlos. Their lawsuit was dismissed in late 2013. The legal dispute was eventually settled. Following the settlement, Carlos did not record or tour with them. However, the three remaining members decided they would continue Cheap Trick as a trio.

Hall of Fame induction and later years (2016–present)
 
On April 1, 2016, the band released its first album in five years, Bang, Zoom, Crazy... Hello. They released a single, "No Direction Home," as a teaser for the album. The album was the band's first record on a major label in 22 years. Daxx Nielsen played drums on the album.

On April 8, 2016, Cheap Trick was inducted into the Rock and Roll Hall of Fame.

On June 16, 2017, the band released the album We're All Alright!. Daxx Nielsen played drums on the album. In August 2017, the band appeared on Insane Clown Posse's single "Black Blizzard". On October 20, 2017, the band released a Christmas album, Christmas Christmas.

On January 29, 2021, Cheap Trick released the single "Light Up The Fire" in the run up to their album In Another World, due for release on April 9, 2021.

The band was announced as part of the 2021 Australian concert series, Under the Southern Stars, alongside Bush and Stone Temple Pilots. They replaced original headliners Live on the bill. In April 2021, the concert series was postponed to 2022.

When Petersson was sidelined from touring in 2021 due to open heart surgery, Zander's son Robin Taylor Zander filled in for him on tour.

Legacy
In 2016, Cheap Trick was inducted into the Rock and Roll Hall of Fame. The induction ceremony was held at the Barclays Center in Brooklyn, New York on April 8, and the band was introduced by Kid Rock. Zander, Nielsen, Petersson, and Carlos were in attendance; with Carlos on drums, the band performed "I Want You to Want Me", "Dream Police", "Surrender" and "Ain't That a Shame".

Cheap Trick have been cited as an influence on several artists in the alternative rock and power pop genre, including Nirvana, Green Day, Pearl Jam, and Smashing Pumpkins.

Band members

Current members
 Rick Nielsen – lead guitar, backing vocals (1973–present); bass (1981–1982)
 Robin Zander – lead vocals, rhythm guitar (1974–present)
 Tom Petersson – bass, backing vocals (1973–1980, 1987–present)

Current touring musicians
 Robin Taylor Zander – guitar, bass, backing vocals (2014–present; guest)

Current touring and session members
 Daxx Nielsen – drums, percussion, backing vocals (2001, 2010–present)

Former members
 Bun E. Carlos – drums, percussion, occasional backing vocals (1973–2010; one-off in 2016)
 Randy Hogan (aka Xeno) – lead vocals (1973–1974)
 Pete Comita – bass, backing vocals (1980–1981)
 Jon Brant – bass, backing vocals (1981–1987, 2004–2005, 2007; one-off 1999)

Former touring musicians
 Magic Cristian – keyboards, backing vocals (1982–1986, one-off 2002, 2008–2011, 2012–2016)
 Steve Walsh – keyboards, backing vocals (1985)
 Mark Radice – keyboards, backing vocals (1985)
 Tod Howarth – keyboards, backing vocals (1986–1987, 1990–1996, 2000, 2008; guest 1999)
 Hank Ransome – drums (fill in Carlos in 1976)

Timeline

<

Discography

 Cheap Trick (1977)
 In Color (1977)
 Heaven Tonight (1978)
 Dream Police (1979)
 All Shook Up (1980)
 One on One (1982)
 Next Position Please (1983)
 Standing on the Edge (1985)
 The Doctor (1986)
 Lap of Luxury (1988)
 Busted (1990)
 Woke Up with a Monster (1994)
 Cheap Trick (1997)
 Special One (2003)
 Rockford (2006)
 The Latest (2009)
 Bang, Zoom, Crazy... Hello (2016)
  We're All Alright! (2017)
 Christmas Christmas (2017)
 In Another World (2021)

Notes

References
 jojos bizarre adventure

External links

 
 

 
1974 establishments in Illinois
American power pop groups
Hard rock musical groups from Illinois
Epic Records artists
Musical groups established in 1974
Musical quartets
American musical trios
Warner Records artists
Culture of Rockford, Illinois
Musicians from Rockford, Illinois